A plane crash is a type of aviation accident or incident. It can also refer to:

 A song by the British progressive rock band Inspiral Carpets, written in 1986 and recorded in 1989 as a B-side for their single Find Out Why
 The EP of the same name, released in 1988 (doesn't include the song)
 Plane Crash / The Plane Crash, 2012 television episode of Curiosity and 2012 programme for Channel 4, respectively